Aluyak (also Romanized as Alūyak and Ālū’ak; also known as Ālūtak and Ālūwank) is a village in Jamalabad Rural District, Sharifabad District, Pakdasht County, Tehran Province, Iran. At the 2006 census, its population was 1,762, in 427 families.

References 

Populated places in Pakdasht County